The 2010 Bulgarian Figure Skating Championships were held on 9 and 10 January 2010. Skaters competed in the disciplines of men's singles, ladies' singles, and pair skating on the senior level.

The results were used to choose the teams to the 2010 Winter Olympics, the 2010 World Championships, and the 2010 European Championships.

Results

Men

Ladies

Pairs

External links
 results

Bulgarian Figure Skating Championships, 2010